The Elixiaceae are a family of lichen-forming fungi in the order Umbilicariales. It contains two genera, Meridianelia, and the type genus, Elixia, which together have a total of three species. The family was circumscribed by lichenologist Helge Thorsten Lumbsch in 1997. The family name honours Australian lichenologist John Alan Elix.

References

Umbilicariales
Lecanoromycetes families
Taxa described in 1997
Taxa named by Helge Thorsten Lumbsch
Lichen families